Jimeoin is an Australian comedy series starring Irish stand-up comedian and actor Jimeoin. The series ran for two seasons in 1994 and 1995 on the Seven Network.

The series also starred Bob Franklin and Brian Nankervis and featured a number of other comedians and actors including Glenn Robbins, Michael Veitch, Daina Reid, Sarah Woods, Penny Baron, Shaun Micallef, Dave O'Neil, Stayci Taylor, Tamara Cook, Rachel Griffiths, Brad Oakes, Angus Smallwood, and Wilhelmina Stracke.

References

External links

Australian comedy television series
Seven Network original programming
Television shows set in Victoria (Australia)
1994 Australian television series debuts
1995 Australian television series endings